Tropical Cyclone Gretelle was a deadly storm that struck southeastern Madagascar in January 1997. The seventh named storm of the 1996–97 South-West Indian Ocean cyclone season, Gretelle developed within the Intertropical Convergence Zone on 19 January, and gradually intensified while moving southwestward. On 22 January, the storm intensified to tropical cyclone status while passing northwest of Réunion; there, Gretelle produced strong wind gusts and heavy rainfall in mountainous regions. On 24 January, Gretelle made landfall near Farafangana, the first in the region in 41 years. The cyclone weakened while crossing Madagascar, but restrengthened slightly in the Mozambique Channel. Gretelle meandered off the coast of Mozambique, bringing gusty winds that downed trees, but caused little damage in the country. An approaching trough turned the cyclone to the southeast, and Gretelle dissipated on 31 January to the south-southwest of Madagascar.

Damage from Cyclone Gretelle was heaviest near where it made landfall in Madagascar. In several villages, over 90% of the buildings were destroyed, leaving about 80,000 people homeless. Wind gusts at Farafangana reached , which knocked trees onto roads and wrecked about 138,000 tons of crops. Overall damage was estimated at around $50 million, and there were 152 deaths. After the storm, there was a coordinated international relief effort to provide food and money to Madagascar.

Meteorological history

The Intertropical Convergence Zone spawned a tropical disturbance on 19 January, developing a circulation just west of St. Brandon. That day, the Météo-France on Réunion (MFR) classified the system as a tropical disturbance, and the Joint Typhoon Warning Center (JTWC) began monitoring the system as a low-pressure area a day prior. The system intensified into Tropical Storm Gretelle late on 20 January, by which time the JTWC gave it the designation Tropical Cyclone 20S. Due to a large ridge centered near Île Amsterdam, the storm tracked generally southwestward toward the Mascarene Islands. Early on 22 January, the JTWC upgraded the storm to the equivalent of a minimal hurricane, and later that day, the MFR upgraded Gretelle to tropical cyclone status, or with 10-minute sustained winds of at least .

Later that day, the cyclone made landfall on southeastern Madagascar near Farafangana near peak intensity. Reports from the United Nations Department of Humanitarian Affairs considered Gretelle the first cyclone to strike the region in 41 years. Gretelle rapidly weakened over land, emerging into the Mozambique Channel as a tropical depression on 25 January. Continuing to the southwest, the depression re-intensified into a tropical storm on 27 January.

After becoming a tropical storm again, Gretelle slowed in the Mozambique Channel. A cold front bypassed the storm to the south, and a building ridge behind it turned Gretelle to a west-northwest drift. Although it approached southeastern Africa on 28 January, an advancing trough turned the storm to the southeast. Accelerating to the south-southeast, Gretelle dissipated on 31 January well to the south-southwest of Madagascar.

Impact

While passing north of Réunion, Gretelle dropped heavy rainfall in the eastern and western portions of the island. Late in its duration, the cyclone produced heavy rainfall but left minimal damage in Mozambique, estimated at $50,000. Winds of over 55 km/h (34 km/h) knocked over trees and caused power outages in Gaza and Maputo provinces. Officials in South Africa issued rain and wind warnings for the northeast coast.

The storm also dropped heavy rainfall, although peak totals were unknown due to the meteorological station in Farafangana being destroyed. Heavy rainfall and high waves left heavy damage near the coast, washing away several boats and causing rivers to overflow. Where Gretelle made landfall, most buildings were damaged or destroyed excluding those made of concrete, leaving about 80,000 people homeless. Among the wrecked buildings included a hospital and a prison. About 95% of homes in Vondrozo were wrecked, and in Farafangana, 90% of government buildings were destroyed. In both southern Midongy and Vangaindrano, nearly every building was destroyed. Gretelle damaged or destroyed 1,538 homes in Manakara.

Reports from the Red Cross indicated that Gretelle was the severest in the region "in living memory", with many people surviving the high tides and winds by "clinging to trees". The storm also damaged water stations, power lines, and thousands of hectares of crops, including food reserves. The World Food Programme estimated that Gretelle destroyed 7,000 tons of rice, 123,500 tons of cassava, and 8,000 tons of cash crops, mostly to coffee. About 40,000 people were isolated for weeks after the storm in Befotaka and Midongy Sud, with many roads blocked by fallen trees. Overall, about 200 people were killed or left missing in Madagascar, with 152 confirmed fatalities by two weeks after the storm, 82 of whom in Vangaindrano. The International Disaster Database later listed 140 as the total fatalities related to Gretelle. Damage from the storm was estimated at $50 million.

Aftermath
After heavy damage from Cyclone Bonita in 1996, the government of Madagascar initiated a disaster response system that was used during Gretelle; there was quick response but efforts were hampered by damaged infrastructure and disrupted transportation. The storm had cut communications in some areas, but by 29 January, or five days after landfall, telephone service was restored to Manakara. Following the storm, the Madagascar government coordinated the distribution of emergency rice rations and other relief items. On 27 January, the government launched a fundraiser on television that raised over ₣130 million (FMG, US$30,000). The southern portion of the country was declared a disaster area. A plane of relief supplies flew from the capital Antananarivo to Manakara along the southeast coast, where trucks distributed the items to the affected areas. A radio station based out of the country criticized the slow pace of relief, citing the lack of available boats after many were destroyed. In addition, there were reports that government aid was being stolen by looters.

In the weeks after the storm, the hardest hit residents faced food shortages and lacked access to clean water, in an area already facing ongoing food shortages. In response, the World Food Programme and other agencies of the United Nations created a program to feed about 350,000 people in the region over three months, providing about 5,900 tons of food. In the months after the storm, roads were repaired, including the link from Vangaindrano to Midongy. Farmers grew additional beans and potatoes to compensate for the damaged crops, while the quick distribution of food prevented significant malnutrition. In the subsequent years, about 40% of the forest at Manombo that regrew following Gretelle was of foreign nature, which threatened the original plants in the region.

Due to the scale of the cyclone damage, the government issued an international appeal for assistance. As a result, the United Nations Department of Humanitarian Affairs provided a grant of $30,000. UNICEF provided about $48,000 to secure drug kits for children impacted by the cyclone. The Red Cross of Seychelles donated about one tonne of clothing and 20 tonnes of tuna, and the Red Cross of Réunion sent drugs to Madagascar. The government of France also sent a crew from Réunion to Madagascar to assist in the aftermath, as well as a plane to airdrop the aid. The governments of Germany, Japan, France, the United Kingdom each donated about $100,000 to Madagascar, while the United States provided about $25,000 and 500 tons of food. The government of Japan also sent 2,040 blankets and 10 tents. By 18 February, the total contributions by the international community reached about $3 million.

Notes

References

1996–97 South-West Indian Ocean cyclone season
Cyclones in Madagascar
Intense Tropical Cyclones
1997 in Madagascar